Nardin (also Romanized as Nardīn and Nardeyn) is a village in Nardin Rural District, Kalpush District, Meyami County, Semnan Province, Iran. At the 2006 census, its population was 2,739, in 714 families.

References 

Populated places in Meyami County